The 2013 DuPont Pioneer 250 was the 12th stock car race of the 2013 NASCAR Nationwide Series and the 3rd iteration of the event. The race was originally scheduled to be held on Saturday, June 8, 2013, but was delayed to Sunday, June 9, due to rain. The race was held in Newton, Iowa at Iowa Speedway, a 7⁄8 mile (1.4 km) permanent D-shaped oval racetrack. At race's end, Trevor Bayne, driving for Roush Fenway Racing, would make a late-race pass on eventual second-place finisher, Richard Childress Racing driver Austin Dillon to win his second and to date, final career NASCAR Nationwide Series win and his first and only win of the season. To fill out the podium, Elliott Sadler of Joe Gibbs Racing would finish third.

Background 

Iowa Speedway is a 7/8-mile (1.4 km) paved oval motor racing track in Newton, Iowa, United States, approximately 30 miles (48 km) east of Des Moines. The track was designed with influence from Rusty Wallace and patterned after Richmond Raceway, a short track where Wallace was very successful. It has over 25,000 permanent seats as well as a unique multi-tiered Recreational Vehicle viewing area along the backstretch.

Entry list 

*Driver changed to Ryan Blaney so Logano could race in the 2013 Party in the Poconos 400.

**Driver changed to Kevin Lepage so Nemechek could race in the 2013 Party in the Poconos 400.

Practice

First practice 
The first practice session was held on Friday, June 7, at 3:30 PM CST, and would last for an hour and 20 minutes.

Second and final practice 
The second and final practice session, sometimes referred to as Happy Hour, was held on Friday, June 7, at 6:00 PM CST, and would last for an hour and 20 minutes.

Qualifying 
Qualifying was held on Saturday, June 8, at 4:05 PM CST. Each driver would have two laps to set a fastest time; the fastest of the two would count as their official qualifying lap.

Morgan Shepherd would be the only driver to fail to qualify.

Full qualifying results

Race results

References 

2013 NASCAR Nationwide Series
NASCAR races at Iowa Speedway
June 2013 sports events in the United States
2013 in sports in Iowa